Malobidion is a genus of beetles in the family Cerambycidae, containing the following species:

 Malobidion auricome Chemsak & Linsley, 1963
 Malobidion brunneum Schaeffer, 1908
 Malobidion grande Chemsak & Linsley, 1963

References

Hesperophanini